B4U also known as B4U Entertainment or B4U TV was an Indian television satellite channel that was launched on 3 September 2000.

B4U Entertainment programming consisted of many genres of television programs, including family dramas boasting female protagonists, comedy series, and shows starring Bollywood celebrities.

Programming
Note:Following is a list of programmes that were broadcast by B4U TV at the time it was on-air. Some of these shows have also been re-aired on other Indian television channels.

Anupamaa
Apne Paraye
Bahuraniyaan
Club 10
Dahshat
Double Sawari
In Conversation with Zeenat
Khushi
Kinare Miltey Nahin
Manthan
Papa
Karz Pichhle Janam Ka
Rehnuma
Rishta Kachche Dhaagon Kaa
Saas Pe Sava Saas
Sangharsh
Sukanya
Star Bite
Tanhaiyaan
Thoda Sa Gum Thodi Khushi

References

External links
B4U TV News Article on Indiantelevision.com
B4U Entertainment News Article
Television channels and stations established in 2000
Television channels and stations disestablished in 2001